Dysomma brevirostre, the pignosed arrowtooth eel or Batnose eel,) is an eel in the family Synaphobranchidae (cutthroat eels). It was described by Luigi Facciolà in 1887. It is a marine, deep water-dwelling eel which is known from the eastern and western Atlantic Ocean, including Madeira Island, the Gulf of Guinea, the Ligurian Sea, Italy, and Florida and Hawaii, USA.

References

Synaphobranchidae
Taxa named by Luigi Facciolà
Fish described in 1887